Daniel James Pearson (born 15 February 1973) is an Australian politician who has been a Labor Party member of the Victorian Legislative Assembly since November 2014, representing the Legislative Assembly seat of Essendon. 

Pearson has served in the Second Andrews Ministry as the Minister for Housing since June 2022, and as the Assistant Treasurer, Minister for Government Services and Minister for Regulatory Reform since June 2020. He was also the Minister for Creative Industries between September 2020 and June 2022.

Pearson is a member of the Australian Workers Union component of the Victorian Labor Right.

References

External links
 Parliamentary voting record of Danny Pearson at Victorian Parliament Tracker

1973 births
Living people
Australian Labor Party members of the Parliament of Victoria
Members of the Victorian Legislative Assembly
University of Melbourne alumni
21st-century Australian politicians
Politicians from Melbourne
Labor Right politicians